Dwarf snakehead is a term coined by aquarists to describe a group of Channa snakehead fishes growing to about  maximum. They are found in freshwater habitats (often streams) in South and Southeast Asia, and southern China.

The following snakeheads belong to this group:

Channa andrao
Channa aurantipectoralis
Channa baramensis
Channa bipuli
Channa bleheri
Channa brunnea 
Channa burmanica
Channa gachua
Channa harcourtbutleri
Channa kelaartii
Channa limbata
Channa lipor
Channa melanostigma
Channa orientalis
Channa ornatipinnis
Channa panaw
Channa pardalis
Channa pulchra
Channa quinquefasciata
Channa rara
Channa royi
Channa shingon
Channa stewartii
Channa stiktos
Channa torsaensis

Some of these are borderline dwarf snakeheads, slightly surpassing  in maximum length (e.g., C. pulchra has been called a dwarf snakehead, but may reach ).

Several of these only recently received their scientific name, but were already known among aquarists before. Examples of this are C. andrao (described 2013, previously known as C. sp. "Lal Cheng" or "blue bleheri"), C. pardalis (described 2016, previously known as C. sp. "Meghalaya leopard"), C. quinquefasciata (described 2018, previously known as C. sp. "five stripe"), C. torsaensis (described 2018, previously known as C. sp. "cobalt blue"), and C. brunnea (described 2019, previously known as C. sp. "chocolate bleheri"). A few dwarf snakeheads that are known from the aquarium trade remain undescribed, including:
Channa sp. "Burmese red rim rainbow" or "redfin". Similar to Channa gachua but has black dots on the body and fin edges are darker.
Channa sp. "fire and ice".
Channa sp. Laos fireback.
Channa sp. Ignis. 

Besides their commonality of being of small size, dwarf snakeheads generally are paternal mouthbrooders (confirmed in some species, suspected in others). An exception is the free-spawning C. bleheri where the eggs float to the surface and the parents take care of them (no mouthbrooding).

Although several dwarf snakeheads are very close relatives, overall the group is not monophyletic. For example, the dwarfs C. burmanica and C. stewartii are phylogenetically much closer to the large C. barca (up to ) than they are to the dwarfs C. ornatipinnis, C. pulchra and C. stiktos.

References

External links
Comprehensive information on snakeheads at snakeheads.org

Channidae
Fish common names